Given Katuta (born 6 March 1969) is a Zambian politician. A member of the Forum for Democracy and Development, Katuta is a member of the National Assembly of Zambia for Chienge constituency.

She was born in Nchelenge and is married to Dr. Lawrence Mwelwa, vice-chancellor of Chreso University.

References

Living people
1969 births
21st-century Zambian politicians
Forum for Democracy and Development politicians
People from Luapula Province
21st-century Zambian women politicians
Members of the National Assembly of Zambia